Forward Together with Kennedy Stewart is a municipal political party in Vancouver, British Columbia, Canada. The party is led by Vancouver politician Kennedy Stewart.

History 

Kennedy Stewart was elected as an independent in the 2018 Vancouver municipal election, presiding over 10 councillors elected from four different parties. Though he pledged to work co-operatively with councillors, ensuing policy disagreements with other parties prompted Stewart to form his own organization in 2020, initially called Team Kennedy Stewart. With Stewart seeking re-election as mayor in the 2022 Vancouver municipal election, Forward Together announced its first three council candidates in June 2022, and another three candidates by September 2022.

The party aimed to elect a "progressive majority" to city council, which, as elected in 2018, was evenly divided between the centre-right/right-wing Non-Partisan Association (NPA) and the centre-left/left-wing Greens, OneCity, and COPE. Forward Together stated it would run up to six council candidates, leaving room for other centre-left parties to elect their own councillors.

Kennedy Stewart, prior to being elected mayor, served as a member of Parliament and was affiliated with the New Democratic Party, as were council candidates Dulcy Anderson (constituency assistant to BC NDP MLA David Eby), Tesicca Truong and Jeanette Ashe (previously BC NDP candidates). Council candidate Russil Wvong served as riding chair for the Vancouver Kingsway Liberal electoral district association.

Stewart was defeated in his candidacy for re-election on October 15, 2022. None of Forward Together's six candidates for city council were elected. The party did not run any candidates for school board or park board, opting to endorse Vision Vancouver's school and parks candidates. Stewart was endorsed by Vision in the mayoral race.

Electoral results

References 

Municipal political parties in Vancouver
2022 establishments in British Columbia
Social democratic parties in Canada